Dylan Stephens (born 8 January 2001) is an Australian rules footballer who plays for the Sydney Swans in the Australian Football League (AFL). He was recruited by the Sydney Swans with the 5th draft pick in the 2019 AFL draft.

Early football
Stephens played junior football for his local club, Red Cliffs Football Club. He attended and played football for St Peter's College in Adelaide, while on a football scholarship. Stephens played for Norwood in the SANFL for the 2019 season, where he played 13 games and kicked six goals. Stephens also represented South Australia in the AFL Under 18 Championships, where he ended up winning the award for Most Valuable Player in the South Australian Side, as well as selection in the All-Australian Under 18 side.

AFL career
Stephens debuted in the Swans' eight point loss to the Richmond Tigers in the 6th round of the 2020 AFL season, alongside teammate Chad Warner. On debut, Stephens collected 11 disposals, 5 marks and 4 tackles, and kicked a behind.

Statistics
Updated to the end of the 2022 season.

|-
| 2020 ||  || 3
| 8 || 2 || 3 || 68 || 32 || 100 || 27 || 27 || 0.2 || 0.3 || 8.5 || 4.0 || 12.5 || 3.3 || 3.3
|-
| 2021 ||  || 3
| 7 || 1 || 1 || 30 || 29 || 59 || 20 || 8 || 0.1 || 0.1 || 4.2 || 4.1 || 8.4 || 2.8 || 1.1
|-
| 2022 ||  || 3
| 15 || 5 || 2 || 171 || 67 || 238 || 63 || 38 || 0.3 || 0.1 || 11.4 || 4.5 || 15.9 || 4.2 || 2.5
|- class=sortbottom
! colspan=3 | Career
! 30 !! 8 !! 6 !! 269 !! 128 !! 397 !! 110 !! 72 !! 0.3 !! 0.2 !! 9.0 !! 4.3 !! 13.2 !! 3.7 !! 2.4
|}

Notes

References

External links
 
 
 

2001 births
Living people
Sydney Swans players
Australian rules footballers from Victoria (Australia)
Norwood Football Club players
Sportsmen from Victoria (Australia)
People educated at St Peter's College, Adelaide